William Martin "Willie" Rogers (15 April 1893 – 22 September 1918) was an Australian rules footballer who played with Carlton in the Victorian Football League. He spent the 1913 season at Carlton before moving to the  Victorian Football Association (VFA) side Brunswick in 1914.

He died of wounds sustained in action in World War I.

Family
The son of John Rogers (-1909), and Mary Rogers (1856-1924), née Fitzgerald, William Martin Rogers was born at Woolamai, Victoria on 15 April 1893.

Football

Carlton (VFL)
In addition to the three senior games he played with the Carlton First XVIII, he also played a number of games for "Carlton District" in the Metropolitan Junior Football Association (MJFA) in 1913.

Brunswick (VFA)
Rogers was granted a clearance from Carlton to Brunswick on 22 April 1914. However, there's no evidence that he ever played in a match for either the Brunswick First XVIII or its associated "Junior" team.

Military service
He enlisted in the First AIF on 26 February 1916, and served overseas with the 3rd Machine Gun Battalion.

He was wounded in action, in France, on 12 October 1917.

He returned to active duty in France in June 1918, and was wounded in action, for a second time, on 18 September 1918.

Death
Unconscious on admission, and failing to regain consciousness, he died of the gunshot wounds he had sustained in active service on 22 September 1918.

See also
 List of Victorian Football League players who died in active service

Footnotes

References
 Holmesby, Russell & Main, Jim (2007). The Encyclopedia of AFL Footballers. 7th ed. Melbourne: Bas Publishing.
 De Bolto, Tony, "Willie Rogers remembered . . . lest we forget", Blueseum, 22 April 2008.
 The AIF Project: Corporal William Martin Rogers (113), UNSW Canberra.
 First World War Nominal Roll: Lance Corporal William Martin Rogers (113A), Australian War Memorial.
 First World War Embarkation Roll: Private William Martin Rogers (113), Australian War Memorial.
 World War One Service Record: Corporal William Martin Rogers (113A), National Archives of Australia.
 Australian Red Cross Wounded and Missing Enquiry Bureau files: Corporal William Martin Rogers (113A), Australian War Memorial.
 Roll of Honour: Corporal William Martin Rogers (113A), Australian War Memorial.

External links

Blueseum profile: Willie Rogers

1918 deaths
Australian rules footballers from Victoria (Australia)
Carlton Football Club players
Australian military personnel killed in World War I
1893 births
Brunswick Football Club players